The 2000 Florida Education Commissioner special election, triggered by the resignation of Education Commissioner Tom Gallagher, took place on November 7, 2000, to elect the Education Commissioner of Florida for the remainder of Gallagher's term. The election was won by future Governor Charlie Crist, who took office on January 3, 2001. This was the last election held to fill this office, as a 1998 constitutional amendment to the Florida Constitution changed it from a statewide elected office to one appointed by the Governor of Florida.

Candidates
Charlie Crist (R), former member of the Florida Senate and nominee for senate in 1998.
George Sheldon (D), former member of the Florida House of Representatives.

Results

References

2000 Florida elections